Cape Brett Lighthouse is a lighthouse at Cape Brett in the Northland Region of the North Island of New Zealand.   The site was surveyed and chosen in 1908 by Captain John Bollons of NZGSS Hinemoa.

The lighthouse was deactivated and keepers were withdrawn in 1978 and replaced by an automated beacon on the same site.

Cape Brett Lighthouse and its associated structures are on the Heritage New Zealand list as a Category 1 Historic Place List No: 7799. It was registered on 26 June 2009.

See also 

 List of lighthouses in New Zealand

References

External links 
 
 
 Website of New Zealand Historic Trust "Cape Brett Lighthouse Station"
 at newzealandlighthouses.com
 History of Cape Brett Lightouse Department of Conservation

Lighthouses completed in 1910
Lighthouses in New Zealand
Far North District
Bay of Islands
1910s architecture in New Zealand
Transport buildings and structures in the Northland Region